Pythium tardicrescens is a plant pathogen infecting barley.

References

Water mould plant pathogens and diseases
Barley diseases
tardicrescens